This is the list of the winning political parties in the Malaysian general election by parliamentary constituency.

See also
Elections in Malaysia

Elections in Malaysia